Erie Hill is a hill in the Moffat Hills range, part of the Southern Uplands of Scotland. A relatively compact summit in comparison to the other hills in the range, it is commonly climbed as part of a round starting from Talla Linnfoots to the north.

Subsidiary SMC Summits

References

Mountains and hills of the Southern Uplands
Mountains and hills of the Scottish Borders
Donald mountains